Tan Sum is a district (amphoe) in the central part of Ubon Ratchathani province, northeastern Thailand.

History
The minor district (king amphoe) Tan Sum was created on 18 September 1978, when the three tambons  Tan Sum, Samrong, and Chik Thoeng were split off from Phibun Mangsahan district. It was upgraded to a full district on 1 January 1988.

Etymology
The old name of the area was Tan Chum (ตาลชุม), which means fertile land with plenty by Toddy palm trees (Borassus flabellifer). Later  the name was changed to Tan Sum.

Geography
Neighboring districts are (from the east clockwise) Si Mueang Mai,  Phibun Mangsahan, Sawang Wirawong, Don Mot Daeng, and Trakan Phuet Phon of Ubon Ratchathani Province.

The important water resource are the Mun and Se Bok Rivers.

Administration
The district is divided into six sub-districts (tambons), which are further subdivided into 59 villages (mubans). Tan Sum is a township (thesaban tambon) which covers parts of tambon Tan Sum. There are a further six tambon administrative organizations (TAO).

Education
1. Tansum Phatthana School
Tansum Phatthana School  is a high school in Tansum County. It is located in Tansum, Ubon Ratchathani , a small town situated 40 km from the town. Students come from several small communities which are similar in economic status.

References

External links
amphoe.com

Tan Sum